is a Japanese footballer currently playing as a forward for Tokyo United.

Career statistics

Club
.

Notes

References

External links

1993 births
Living people
Japanese footballers
Association football forwards
J3 League players
Iwaki FC players
Iwate Grulla Morioka players
Tokyo United FC players